Olango may refer to:

Olango Island Group, group of islands in the Philippines
Alfred Olango (1978–2016), Ugandan refugee fatally shot by police in El Cajon, California, U.S.

See also
Olingo, a small South American mammal